Lin Chen-hua (born 26 December 1988) is a Taiwanese baseball Pitcher for the Fubon Guardians of the Chinese Professional Baseball League (CPBL). He attended Chinese Culture University and was the first overall pick in the 2011 CPBL draft by the Sinon Bulls.

Lin represented Taiwan at 2009 World Port Tournament, 2009 Asian Baseball Championship, 2010 Haarlem Baseball Week, 2010 World University Baseball Championship, 2010 Intercontinental Cup, 2011 World Port Tournament, 2011 The Grand Forks International baseball tournament, 2011 Baseball World Cup and the 2017 World Baseball Classic.

References

1988 births
2017 World Baseball Classic players
Chinese Culture University alumni
EDA Rhinos players
Fubon Guardians players
Living people
Sinon Bulls players
Baseball players from Kaohsiung
Brisbane Bandits players
Taiwanese expatriate baseball players in Australia